Graphistylis is a genus of Brazilian flowering plants in the daisy family.

 Species
 Graphistylis argyrotricha (Dusén) B.Nord. - Minas Gerais, Rio de Janeiro
 Graphistylis cuneifolia (Gardner) B.Nord. - Rio de Janeiro
 Graphistylis dichroa (Bong.) D.J.N.Hind - Minas Gerais, Rio de Janeiro, Santa Catarina, São Paulo
 Graphistylis itatiaiae (Dusén) B.Nord. - Minas Gerais, Rio de Janeiro, São Paulo
 Graphistylis oreophila (Dusén) B.Nord. - Rio de Janeiro, Santa Catarina, São Paulo
 Graphistylis organensis (Casar.) B.Nord. - Espirito Santo, Minas Gerais, Rio de Janeiro, Santa Catarina, São Paulo
 Graphistylis riopretensis A.M.Teles & B.Nord. - Minas Gerais 
 Graphistylis toledoi (Cabrera) B.Nord. - São Paulo

References

Senecioneae
Endemic flora of Brazil
Asteraceae genera